The Towers Hospital was a mental health facility in Humberstone, Leicestershire, England. The administration building, which became known as George Hine House, is a Grade II listed building.

History
The site chosen for the hospital had previously been occupied by Victoria House, the former home of Benjamin Broadbent, a master builder. The hospital, which was designed by Edward Loney Stephens using a corridor layout with compact arrow additions, opened as the Leicester Borough Lunatic Asylum in September 1869. An extension to the male ward, designed by George Thomas Hine, was completed in 1883 and a corresponding extension to the female ward, also designed by Hine, was completed in 1890. A bath house, also designed by Hine, was added in 1913. The facility became the Leicester City Mental Hospital in the 1920s. Three detached villa properties, built in the 1930s, were made available to the Emergency Medical Service during the Second World War. The facility joined the National Health Service as the Towers Hospital in 1948.

After the introduction of Care in the Community in the early 1980s, the hospital went into a period of decline and closed in April 2013. The administration building, which became known as George Hine House, was converted for use as a Sikh free school in 2014. Several of the other buildings, including the original main block with superintendent's residence above, have been redeveloped for residential use.

References

Hospital buildings completed in 1869
Hospitals established in 1869
1869 establishments in England
2013 disestablishments in England
Hospitals disestablished in 2013
Defunct hospitals in England
Former psychiatric hospitals in England
Hospitals in Leicestershire